The 2014–15 Duke Blue Devils men's basketball team represented Duke University during the 2014–15 NCAA Division I men's basketball season as members of the Atlantic Coast Conference. The team played its home games in Durham, North Carolina at Cameron Indoor Stadium, celebrating the arena's 75th anniversary. Mike Krzyzewski led the team as head coach in his 35th season with the Blue Devils. During the season, Krzyzewski became the first head coach in Division I men's basketball history to win 1,000 games. On the court, the team featured All-ACC players Jahlil Okafor, Quinn Cook, and Tyus Jones, with Okafor being named ACC Player of the Year and National Freshman of the Year.

Duke began the season by winning its first 14 games, the seventh such start in school history. During this stretch, Duke won the 2014 Coaches vs. Cancer Classic, defeating Stanford in the championship game. In ACC play, the Blue Devils finished in 2nd place with a 15–3 conference record. They were ranked in the top 5 of the AP poll for the entire season.

The team reached the semifinals of the 2015 ACC tournament before losing to eventual champion Notre Dame. In the NCAA tournament, Duke earned the number 1 seed in the south region, playing its first two games in Charlotte, North Carolina before advancing to the regionals at NRG Stadium in Houston, Texas. By beating Gonzaga 66–52 in the regional final, Duke advanced to the Final Four at Lucas Oil Stadium in Indianapolis, Indiana. The win marked the 16th Final Four appearance in school history. In the National Championship game, the Blue Devils beat the Wisconsin Badgers 68–63, winning a fifth national championship for both Duke and Krzyzewski. Tyus Jones was the tournament's Most Outstanding Player.

Off season

Departures

After the 2013–14 season, Duke lost 4 seniors and 2 underclassmen from the squad. The six players leaving the team accounted for over half of the team's scoring and nearly half of the rebounding during the previous year. Among the senior departures were Tyler Thornton, who started 25 games in his senior season, and Andre Dawkins, who was the last remaining member from the 2010 NCAA Championship team. The two underclassmen, Jabari Parker and Rodney Hood, declared for the 2014 NBA draft on consecutive days and were both selected in the 1st round. Parker led the team in points, rebounds, and blocks, with Hood being the second leading scorer on the team.

In addition to the player departures, Duke also lost a member of the coaching staff. Associate head coach Steve Wojciechowski left the program to become the head coach of the Marquette Golden Eagles. To replace him, assistant coach Jeff Capel was promoted to associate head coach, and special assistant Jon Scheyer was promoted to assistant coach.

# – Denotes departure that occurred during 2014–15 season

Class of 2014 signees

Duke brought in a recruiting class of four players to join the 2014–15 roster. Guard Grayson Allen was the first to commit, doing so soon after his junior season at Providence School. Throughout the summer of 2013, much of Duke's recruiting efforts were focused on point guard Tyus Jones and Center Jahlil Okafor. Both were consensus top 10 recruits in the class of 2014, with Okafor being named the number one prospect by many major recruiting services. The pair had long been rumored to be planning on committing to the same college in spite of living hundreds of miles apart and the rarity of package deals coming to fruition. That November, the rumors were confirmed when the pair announced their decision during concurrent press conferences. Only a week later, 5-star small forward Justise Winslow announced that he would join the Blue Devils as well. Winslow's commitment gave Duke the number 1 recruiting class of 2014 according to the major recruiting services, the first school other than Kentucky to be ranked #1 in six years. In the spring, all four players were named to the McDonald's All-America team with Allen winning the dunk contest, Jones capturing the skills competition and Okafor earning co-MVP honors for the game. Over the summer of 2014, Duke also added Sean Obi, a transfer from Rice, though he would redshirt during the 2014–15 season due to NCAA rules.

Preseason

Expectations
Duke entered the 2014–15 season with high expectations. The combination of freshman talent and veteran leadership led many to put the Blue Devils on the early short list of Final Four contenders. Duke was named the favorite to win the ACC by the media at Operation Basketball, the league's annual media event. Nationally, Duke was ranked #4 and #3 in the preseason polls by the Associated Press and coaches respectively, earning 2 first-place votes in the coaches poll.

Expectations were just as high inside the program. After a disappointing early exit in the 2014 NCAA tournament, incoming freshman Tyus Jones sent a text message to Coach Krzyzewski saying "this won’t happen next year" in reference to the defeat. Senior guard Quinn Cook was preparing to cede his starting point guard role to Jones and transition to shooting guard, a position he had not played regularly in the past. Cook was quick to dismiss any speculation that Jones was coming in to replace him in the lineup, stating that his willingness to change positions was driven by his desire to win. Hanging a banner in Cameron Indoor Stadium, something that requires winning an ACC championship or reaching the Final Four, was a major goal for the team. Cook told the media that "I don’t feel like I’ve accomplished anything," referencing the fact that his previous teams had not raised any banners. Cook proved his work ethic over the summer, remaining in Durham the entire summer to work out. That hard work helped him earn the title of captain prior to the season along with junior Amile Jefferson. Jefferson had his own high expectations for the team, stating that "our guys have been preparing this summer to do something special."

Awards and watchlists
Aside from the team expectations, many individuals on the roster were highly praised during the preseason, none more so than freshman center Jahlil Okafor. In preseason interviews, teammates and coaches described Okafor's game as "dominant". The national media agreed with that assessment, with CBSSports.com and NBCSports.com naming him preseason player of the year. Additionally, he was named to the preseason All-American team by most major media outlets, including the AP, USBWA and Sporting News. Within the ACC, he was named preseason freshman of the year and was voted on to the preseason All-ACC team at Operation Basketball. Okafor was not the only player to receive high praise heading into the season. Fellow freshman Tyus Jones was named to preseason All-American second team by USA Today and third team by CBSSports.com.

Additionally, Okafor and Jones, along with senior Quinn Cook and Freshman Justise Winslow were named to several watch lists for prestigious postseason awards. Duke's three star freshmen were named to the watch list for the Naismith Award, with Okafor and Jones tabbed to the Wooden Award watch list, while Okafor and Winslow were named to the Robertson Trophy watch list. All three freshman made the Tisdale Award watch list, given to the national freshman of the year. Cook and Jones were tabbed for the Cousy Award watch list for best point guard in the nation.

Roster

Semi Ojeleye transfer

On December 14, Duke announced that sophomore forward Semi Ojeleye would leave the program, granting him his full release. Coach Krzyzewski called him "an excellent student and a great representative of our school and basketball program." After a successful high school career, in which he was named the 2013 Parade National Player of the Year, he struggled to find playing time as a freshman, logging only 80 minutes. While he did see the court more as a sophomore, playing 63 minutes through Duke's first 8 games of the year, the vast majority of that playing time came during blowouts at home. He only logged 6 combined minutes in Duke's four games away from Cameron, sitting out games against Stanford and Wisconsin entirely.

After announcing his transfer, he immediately drew interest from several high major programs. He did not spend much time in choosing a program, however, deciding to join SMU and head coach Larry Brown less than two weeks after the initial announcement. His quick decision allowed him to enroll at SMU for the spring semester to begin his NCAA-mandated year in residence before becoming eligible for the spring semester in 2016.

Rasheed Sulaimon dismissal

On January 29, Duke announced that Rasheed Sulaimon had been dismissed from the program. The announcement came as a surprise as there were few warning signs that his status with the team was in question. During his sophomore season, the coaching staff took issue with the way Sulaimon had handled adversity, going as far as benching him for an entire game against Michigan in late 2013. In his junior year, however, there were no outward signs that this was still the case, and he had not been the subject of any publicly disclosed discipline since that game. The only official explanation of the dismissal was a quote from Coach Krzyzewski in the press release stating that Sulaimon had failed to "consistently live up to the standards required to be a member of our program". Sulaimon was the first person to be dismissed from the team by Krzyzewski as head coach of Duke. It was also announced that while Sulaimon had been dismissed from the team, he remained a student at the university and was in good academic standing.

A month later, on March 2, the dismissal came under new scrutiny as Duke's student newspaper, The Chronicle, published accusations that two women had separately claimed that Sulaimon had sexually assaulted them. While the two alleged victims did not come forward directly, multiple participants in the retreats told The Chronicle that accusations were made at the retreats. Further accusations were made in the article claiming that the coaching staff, athletics department, and university administration knew of the allegations for a year prior to Sulaimon's dismissal, and had failed to act. The next day, athletic director Kevin White stated that all accusations of misconduct within the department are referred to the Office of Student Conduct, and that the entire coaching staff has fulfilled their responsibilities. White, and all other Duke faculty and staff declined to address Sulaimon specifically, however, citing FERPA. On March 5, it was revealed by Sulaimon's lawyer that he was not under investigation at the time, but an investigation by the Office of Student Conduct had taken place and been completed in 2014.

There was little new information in the following weeks in regards to both dismissal and the allegations. Sports Illustrated had reported that a number of events culminated in his dismissal, and the original Chronicle article on the allegations claimed that Duke's sports information director told the paper on the day of the dismissal that it was multiple actions rather than a single one that led to the dismissal. On April 29, Sulaimon broke his silence in an interview with ESPN’s Jeff Goodman. He confirmed that he had been interviewed by Duke’s Office of Student Conduct during the winter of 2013–14 and again in September 2014, but that the investigation never progressed to a hearing. He also said that he was planning on graduating during the summer and transferring for his final year of eligibility. On May 11, it was announced that Sulaimon would transfer to Maryland to finish his collegiate career.

Schedule and results

Exhibitions

The Blue Devils’ season began on October 25 with Countdown to Craziness, Duke's version of Midnight Madness. The event featured a dunk contest, won by redshirt junior Marshall Plumlee, as well as an intra-squad scrimmage. Freshman Jahlil Okafor topped all scorers, tallying 27 points in the 24-minute scrimmage. Duke's first game against outside competition came 10 days later against Livingstone College. The Blue Devils nearly doubled the score of the Blue Bears in a 115–58 victory. Seven of Duke's ten players scored in double figures while point guard Tyus Jones tallied 11 assists. Duke's final exhibition was played against Central Missouri, the defending Division II national champions. The game marked the sixth straight season in which Duke played an exhibition game against the reigning Division II champions. The Blue Devils struggled early, falling behind the Mules 13–7 early before taking control of the game, winning 87–47 behind 17 points from Justise Winslow.

Regular season

November

Duke hosted its first two games of the year as part of the 2015 Coaches vs. Cancer Classic. The first game, on November 14 against Presbyterian, saw Duke start three freshmen in a season opener for the first time in over 30 years. In spite of the youth, there were no early nerves as Duke raced out to a 38-point halftime lead en route to a 113–44 victory. The 69-point margin of victory was the third largest in Duke history. The next night, the team followed up the win with a 109–59 victory over Fairfield. By scoring over 100 points against the Stags, Duke started the season with consecutive 100-point games for the first time since 1991–92. During the game, Quinn Cook scored his 1,000th career point, becoming the 64th player in Duke history to achieve that mark.

In the Champions Classic, the Blue Devils travelled to Indianapolis for their first game of the year against a ranked opponent, #19 Michigan State. Duke's first game away from home proved to be a successful one as Duke scored on the inside and outside, leading the entire way in an 81–71 victory. On the inside, Jahlil Okafor showed off a variety of post moves on his way to 17 points, while on the outside, the team shot 50% from the three-point line. The win improved Duke's record in the event to 3–1, best of the four participating teams.

On November 21 and 22, Duke continued its road trip, visiting the Barclays Center in Brooklyn for the championship rounds of the Coaches vs. Cancer Classic. In the semifinals, Duke played Temple, with the defense leading the way in a 74–54 victory. Duke held the Owls to just 37 percent shooting for the game, while also forcing 17 turnovers. In the finals, Duke met Stanford, led by former Blue Devil Johnny Dawkins. It was the first time Dawkins and Coach K had faced off against each other as head coaches. Defense was once again a big factor as Duke held Stanford to 36 percent from the field on its way to winning the championship by a score of 70–59. Quinn Cook scored 18 points to earn tournament MVP honors, while Jahlil Okafor and Justise Winslow also made the all-tournament team.

Duke returned home for two games to close out the month. First, Duke cruised to an easy 93–54 win over the Furman Paladins on November 26. The Blue Devils then faced Coach K's former squad, the Army Black Knights, on November 30. Army proved to be a tougher test, pulling within single digits of Duke early in the second half, but Duke pulled away from there, winning 93–73. Overall, Duke finished the month with a 7–0 record, trailing for just 48 seconds combined in those games.

December

On December 3, Duke travelled to Madison, Wisconsin for the ACC–Big Ten Challenge in what would be its toughest test to date, #2 Wisconsin in the Kohl Center. With preseason all-Americans Jahlil Okafor and Frank Kaminsky squaring off in the post, the game was billed as the marquee matchup of the challenge and a potential Final Four preview. The game lived up to the hype, with Duke leading most of the way behind a 22-point effort from Tyus Jones. Wisconsin was able to stay close, however, with major contributions from Kaminsky and Traevon Jackson. In the end, Duke's offense was the difference, shooting over 65 percent from the field in the 80–70 Duke win. It was the first time in the history of the Kohl Center that a visiting team shot over 60 percent from the field. The win helped Duke climb to #2 in the polls, while Jones' performance earned him National Freshman of the Week honors.

The Blue Devils would not play again for 12 days due to final exams, with their next contest on December 15 against Elon. The team struggled, committing 17 turnovers in the game and allowing Elon to close within 12 points in the middle of the second half. The team was able to hold off Elon 75–62 largely due to the efforts of Jahlil Okafor. He scored 25 points and grabbed 20 rebounds in the game, becoming the first Duke player since Elton Brand to post 20 and 20 in a game. His performance earned him recognition as the Wayman Tisdale national freshman of the week. Three days later, Duke traveled to New Jersey for a game against the defending National Champion UConn Huskies at the IZOD Center. Despite entering the game with only a 4–3 record, UConn proved to be a formidable opponent, holding the Blue Devils to 37.5% shooting and tying the game early in the second half. Duke was once again able to pull away, however, winning 66–56.

Duke closed out the calendar year at home with wins over Toledo and Wofford, finishing December with a 12–0 record and maintaining their #2 ranking in the polls.

January
Duke's first game of the new year was also the start of conference play, but the Devils continued their stellar play from December with an 85–62 victory over Boston College. The game featured another big performance from Okafor, scoring 28 points in the game, shooting 14–17 from the foul line, a surprising number given that Okafor was normally about a 50 percent foul shooter. Duke's next game against Wake Forest proved to be the first real chink in the armor for the team. In Duke's first 13 games, the team only trailed for just over 6 minutes combined. In the Wake Forest game, they trailed for over 5 minutes, including a late deficit with just 6 minutes left in the game. Duke would eventually hold on to win 73–65, but the game ended the Blue Devils streak of double-digit wins at 13.

Duke's struggles would only get worse over the next two games, especially at the defensive end of the floor. Duke's 14 game winning streak to start the year came to an end on January 11 in Raleigh against NC State. The Wolfpack shot over 60% from 3-point range on their way to an 87–75 win. Duke's defensive woes would carry over to their next game against Miami, with the Hurricanes shooting 18–27 in the second half in a 90–74 win at Cameron Indoor Stadium. It was Duke's first loss at home since 2012, breaking a 41-game home winning streak. After the game, Coach K said that he felt that something had been missing with the team since Christmas.

The Blue Devils would not have much time to figure out what was missing, as their next game saw the team travel to #6 Louisville. Duke not only had to navigate the prospect of its first 3-game losing streak since 2007, but also a top ten opponent anticipating their first match-up with the Blue Devils as members of the ACC. In response to the struggling defense from the previous 2 games, Coach Krzyzewski employed a surprising tactic for the game, a zone defense. While Duke had not been known for playing much zone under Coach K, the strategy worked, as the Cardinals shot a mere 4–25 from behind the 3 point line. With the offense being paced by Amile Jefferson, who scored a career-high 19 points to go along with 7 rebounds, the Devils earned a 63–52 win on the road.

After returning home for a 79–65 win over Pitt, the Blue Devils embarked on a 3-game road trip to end the month. First up was a trip to New York to face St. John's in Coach Krzyzewski's first attempt to reach 1,000 wins for his career. After a fast start for the Blue Devils, the Red Storm took control of the game, building a 10-point lead in the second half. Sparked by a game-high 22 points from Tyus Jones, along with 17 each for Jahlil Okafor and Quinn Cook, Duke was able to comeback and win by a score of 77–68. The road trip continued to Indiana, where the Blue Devils faced #8 Notre Dame, led by former Duke assistant Mike Brey. Sparked by a double-double from Jerian Grant, the Irish were to defeat the Devils by a score of 77–73. The final game of the road trip pitted Duke against #2 Virginia, who entered the game undefeated. The match-up was also featured on ESPN's College Gameday, the first time the program had ever aired from Virginia's campus. Duke struggled shooting the ball for much of the game, missing on their first 9 3-point attempts to allow Virginia to build an 11-point lead in the middle of the second half. Duke found its offense in the final eight minutes of the game, however, scoring 28 points in just 11 possessions during that span to cap off a 69–63 win.

February

Duke returned home for two games to begin February. In a match up with Georgia Tech, the Blue Devils struggled to a narrow 72–66 victory. Despite leading the entire second half, Duke needed some late free throws from Quinn Cook, part of a 17-point second half performance, to seal the game. With the win, Coach Krzyzewski set the record for most ACC wins, with 423. The next game was a rematch from just 10 days earlier against Notre Dame. The Blue Devils were able to flip the result of the previous loss in South Bend, using an early 43–7 run to win in a rout, 90–60. The loss was the biggest margin of defeat for Notre Dame since 1999.

Results

|-
!colspan=12 style="background:#00009C; color:#FFFFFF;"| Exhibition

|-
!colspan=12 style="background:#00009C; color:#FFFFFF;"| Regular season

|-
!colspan=12 style="background:#00009C; color:#FFFFFF;"| ACC Tournament

|-
!colspan=12 style="background:#00009C; color:#FFFFFF;"| NCAA tournament

Rankings

*AP does not release post-NCAA tournament rankings

Awards

In-season

‡ – Award shared with Xavier Rathan-Mayes

Postseason

 All-Americans
 Jahlil Okafor – 1st Team (AP, NABC, USBWA, Sporting News, Wooden)
 Quinn Cook – 2nd Team (Sporting News), Honorable Mention (AP)
 Tyus Jones – Honorable Mention (AP)
 Wayman Tisdale Award (National Freshman of the Year)
 Jahlil Okafor
 Pete Newell Big Man Award
 Jahlil Okafor
 ACC Player of the Year
 Jahlil Okafor
 ACC Rookie of the Year
 Jahlil Okafor
 All-ACC Team
 Jahlil Okafor – 1st Team
 Quinn Cook – 2nd Team
 Tyus Jones – 3rd Team
 Justise Winslow – Honorable Mention
 NCAA Tournament Most Outstanding Player
 Tyus Jones
 NCAA Final Four All-Tournament Team
 Tyus Jones
 Grayson Allen
 Justise Winslow
 NCAA South Regional Most Outstanding Player
 Tyus Jones
 NCAA South Regional All-Tournament Team
 Tyus Jones
 Matt Jones
 Justise Winslow
 All-ACC Academic Team
 Grayson Allen
 Amile Jefferson
 Tyus Jones
 Marshall Plumlee
 Justise Winslow
 Winged Foot Award
 Mike Krzyzewski

Notes

References

Duke Blue Devils
Duke Blue Devils men's basketball seasons
Duke
NCAA Division I men's basketball tournament Final Four seasons
NCAA Division I men's basketball tournament championship seasons